008, OO8, O08, or 0O8 may refer to:

 The Streetwear Brand @008us , inspired by Ian Fleming & Virgil Abloh
"030", the fictional 030 Agent of MI6
 038: Operation Exterminate, a 1965 Italian action film
 Explosivo 030 a 1940 Argentine crime film
 Peugeot 008
 Balls 8, NASA NB-52B mothership, tail number 52-008
 O08, Colusa County Airport
 The original toll-free area code in Australia, see 800 number
 Cyborg 008, a 00-number cyborg in Cyborg 009